The OMB A-133 Compliance Supplement is a large and extensive United States federal government guide created by the Office of Management and Budget (OMB) and used in auditing federal assistance and federal grant programs, as well as their respective recipients. It is considered to be the most important tool of an auditor for a Single Audit.

It was created following amendments in 1996 to the Single Audit Act based on numerous studies performed by the Government Accountability Office, the President's Council on Integrity and Efficiency and the National State Auditors Association (NSAA). It serves to identify existing important compliance requirements that the Federal Government expects to be considered as part of a Single Audit. Without it, auditors would need to research many laws and regulations for each single program of a recipient to determine which compliance requirements are important to the Federal Government. For Single Audits, the Supplement replaces any agency audit guides and other audit requirement documents for individual Federal programs.

Divisions
The OMB A-133 Compliance Supplement is divided into 7 divisions:

 Part I: Background, Purpose, and Applicability – Presents a brief description of the history of the Single Audit, defines the purpose of the OMB Circular A-133, and establishes where and why the Single Audit applies.
 Part II: Matrix of Compliance Requirements – This section is a table which details the federal programs which are common within the US and specifies which compliance requirement applies to each program.
 Part III: Compliance Requirements – This section provides guidance and description on the 14 types of compliance guidelines established by federal agencies which summarize the compliance with federal laws and regulations in a general way. It also provides the auditor with certain audit objectives and suggested audit procedures to facilitate the audit. All federal programs, recipients, and auditors are required to follow these guidelines.
 Part IV: Agency Program Requirements – By far the largest section of the Supplement, this section is similar to Part III with the exception that it provides the information program by program in substantial detail. Whereas Part III simply discusses the 14 compliance requirements, this section discusses how each requirement applies to a particular program. This section also provides a brief history of the program, discusses program objectives and operations, and provides the auditor with much more specific suggested audit procedures.
 Part V: Clusters of Programs – This section is similar to Part IV, with the exception that it discusses clusters of programs, which are a grouping of closely related programs that have similar compliance requirements, such as  Research and Development (R&D), Student Financial Aid (SFA), and other clusters. Although the programs within a cluster are administered as separate programs, a cluster of programs is treated as a single program for the purpose of meeting the audit requirements of OMB Circular A-133.
 Part VI: Internal Control – Federal guidelines require recipients to implement an internal control system to manage federal funds in keeping with compliance requirements. They also require auditors to obtain an understanding of the recipient's system as well as verify if it is operating correctly. This section helps recipients and auditors by describing, for each type of compliance requirement, the objectives and certain characteristics of internal control that, when present and operating effectively, may ensure compliance with program requirements. This is especially helpful for auditors because it describes characteristics of internal control which may be implemented and used by the recipient and verified and audited by the auditor to reasonably ensure compliance with the types of compliance requirements in Part III.
 Part VII: Guidance for Auditing Programs Not Included in This Compliance Supplement – This section provides guidance to auditors regarding federal programs that were not covered in Part II, Part IV and Part V of the Supplement, including providing suggestions on how to research for laws and regulations applicable to that particular program and suggesting audit procedures to perform.

Compliance requirements

Compliance requirements are series of directives established by US federal government agencies that guide recipients and auditors on how federal assistance should be managed. The OMB created 14 basic requirements which group all those compliance requirements and provided extensive array of information about them in the Compliance Supplement.

See also
 Single Audit
 Compliance requirements
 Code of Federal Regulations
 Federal assistance in the United States
 Federal grant

References

Further reading
 Federal Grants Management Handbook, Thompson Publishing Group
 Rhett D. Harrell (May 4, 2006), Local Government and Single Audits 2006, CCH (Wolters Kluwer),

OMB Circulars
The following is a list of circular letters issued by the US Office of Management and Budget which provide significant information and guidance for Federal agencies, recipients, auditors, and the general public over the use and management of federal funds, operations of federal assistance programs, and agencies' and recipients' compliance requirements over laws and regulations imposed by the federal government:
 OMB Circular A-21, "Cost Principles for Educational Institutions"
 OMB Circular A-87, "Cost Principles for State, Local, and Indian Tribal Governments"
 OMB Circular A-110, "Uniform Administrative Requirements for Grants and Agreements with Institutions of Higher Education, Hospitals, and Other Non-Profit Organizations"
 OMB Circular A-122, "Cost Principles for Non-Profit Organizations"
 OMB Circular A-133, "Audits of States, Local Governments, and Non-Profit Organizations"
 OMB Circular A-133, "Compliance Supplement 2014"

External links
 US Office of Management and Budget website
 OMB A-133 Compliance Supplement: Table of Contents
 ACART - A123 Compliance, Documentation, & Reporting Solution

Single Audit
United States Office of Management and Budget